The Alex T. Duffy Fairgrounds is a multi-purpose facility in Watertown, New York, spanning 67 acres. The stadium capacity is 3,500. It contains the longest-running fair in the United States, The Jefferson County Fair, and was named after Alex T. Duffy.

Events

Baseball
A baseball park on the grounds serves as home to the Watertown Rapids of the Perfect Game Collegiate Baseball League. The ballpark has a capacity of 2,500 people and opened in 1936. It served as minor league baseball home to the 1936 Watertown Grays of the Class C level Canadian-American League and Watertown Athletics of the Class C level Border League from 1946 to 1951. From 1983 until 1998 it was the home of the Watertown Pirates and Watertown Indians of the Class A level New York–Penn League. In 1999, the New York Penn-League franchise moved to Staten Island and became the Staten Island Yankees through 2019.

Football
The Watertown Red & Black play their home games at the fairgrounds. The stadium's namesake, Alex Duffy, was a longtime member of the Red & Black during its prime days as a professional team.

Ice hockey
The Watertown Municipal Arena is located on the fairgrounds. Since 2012, the arena has been used for a minor professional hockey team now called the Watertown Wolves of the Federal Prospects Hockey League. It was originally called the 1000 Islands Privateers when it moved from Alexandria Bay to Watertown, and it took the  2015–16 season off for arena renovations.

Other events
As its name implies, the area is home to the Jefferson County Fair in late July of each year. 
Built in the late 1800's, it originally included a horse racing track where the grandstands now sits.

From 1951 until 1974 it was home to the Watertown Speedway.

References

External links
Photographs of Alex P. Duffy Fairgrounds – Rochester Area Ballparks

Sports venues in Jefferson County, New York
Minor league baseball venues
Baseball venues in New York (state)
Indoor ice hockey venues in New York (state)
American football venues in New York (state)
Buildings and structures in Watertown, New York